Admiral Yi Sun-sin (April 28, 1545 – December 16, 1598) was a Korean admiral and military general famed for his victories against the Japanese navy during the Imjin war in the Joseon Dynasty. Over the course of his career, Admiral Yi fought in at least 23 recorded naval engagements, all against the Japanese. In most of these battles, he was outnumbered and lacked necessary supplies. He nonetheless won battle after battle. His most famous victory occurred at the Battle of Myeongnyang, where despite being outnumbered 333 (133 warships, at least 200 logistical support ships)  to 13, he managed to disable or destroy 31 Japanese warships without losing a single ship of his own. Yi died from a gunshot wound at the Battle of Noryang on 16 December 1598, the closing battle of the Imjin War.

Yi is regarded as one of the greatest naval commanders in history, with commentators praising his strategic vision, intelligence, innovations, and personality. Yi is celebrated as a national hero in Korea, with multiple landmarks, awards and towns named after him, as well as numerous films and documentaries centered on his exploits. His personal diaries, Nanjung Ilgi, covering a seven year period, are listed as part of the UNESCO world heritage.

Early life
Yi was born in Geoncheon-dong Street (건천동; 乾川洞), Hanseong (then capital, present-day Inhyeon-dong, Jung-gu District, Seoul) but spent his adolescence and early adulthood period before passing the military examination in Asan where his mother's relatives lived and where a shrine to him now stands.

His family was part of the Korean Deoksu Yi clan. His grandfather Yi Baek-rok (이백록; 李百祿) retired from politics when neo-Confucian reformer Jo Gwang-jo was executed in the Third Literati Purge of 1519 and moved to a village near where Jo was buried. Yi Sun-sin's father Yi Jeong (이정, 李貞) was likewise disillusioned with politics and did not enter government service as expected of a yangban (noble) family. However, popular belief that Yi Sun-sin had difficult childhood because of his family's connection with Jo (as depicted in KBS TV series Immortal Admiral Yi Sun-sin) is not true.

One of the most important events of his early life was when Yi met and became friends with Ryu Seong-ryong (류성룡; 柳成龍; 1542–1607), a prominent scholar who held the key official position of Dochaechalsa (도체찰사; 都體察使), and was in command of the military during the Japanese invasions of Korea (1592–1598). 

As a young boy, Yi played war games with other local boys, showing excellent leadership talent at an early age and constructed his own bow and fletched his own arrows as a teenager.

Military career
In 1576, Yi passed the military examination (무과; 武科). He is said to have impressed the judges with his archery, but failed to pass the test when he broke a leg during the cavalry examination. After he re-entered and passed the examination, he was posted to the Bukbyeong (Northern Frontier Army) military district in Hamgyeong province. However, he was the oldest junior officer at the age of thirty-two. There, Yi experienced battles defending the border settlements against the Jurchen marauders and quickly became known for his strategic skills and leadership.

In 1583, he lured the Jurchen into battle, defeated the marauders, and captured their chief, Mu Pai Nai. According to a contemporary tradition, Yi then spent three years out of the army upon hearing of his father's death. After his return to the front line, Yi led a string of successful campaigns against the Jurchen.

However, his brilliance and accomplishments so soon in his career made his superiors jealous, and they falsely accused him of desertion during battle. The conspiracy was led by General Yi Il (이일; 李鎰; 1538–1601), who would later fail to repel the Japanese invasion at the Battle of Sangju. This tendency to sabotage and frame professional adversaries was very common in the later years of the Joseon military and government. Yi was stripped of his rank, imprisoned, and tortured. After his release, Yi was allowed to fight as an enlisted soldier. After a short period of time, however, he was appointed as the commander of the Seoul Hunryeonwon (a military training center) and was later transferred to a small county, to be its military magistrate.

Yi's efforts in northern Korea were rewarded when he was assigned as Commander of the Jeolla Province (전라 좌도; 全羅左道) Left Naval District. Within the span of a few months in late 1590, he received four military appointments, in rapid succession, with each subsequent post carrying greater responsibility than the last: Commander of the Kosarijin Garrison in Pyeongan province, Commander of the Manpo Garrison, also in Pyeongan province, and the Commander of the Wando Garrison, in Jeolla province, before finally receiving the appointment as Commander of the Left Jeolla Naval District.

The royal court was in a state of confusion over the possibility of a war with Japan, now unified under the rule of Toyotomi Hideyoshi, and the unstable situation in Manchuria where a young Jurchen chieftain named Nurhaci was gathering strength. Nurhaci's descendants would become masters of China as founders of the Qing Dynasty in a few decades' time, after invading Korea in 1627 and 1637.

Yi assumed his new post at Yeosu on the 13th day of the 2nd lunar month of 1591 (March 13, 1591). From there, he was able to undertake a buildup of the regional navy, which was later used to confront the Japanese invasion force. He subsequently began to strengthen the province's navy with a series of reforms, including the construction of the turtle ship.

Japanese invasions of Korea (1592–1598)

Yi is remembered for his numerous victories fighting the Japanese during the Japanese invasions of Korea (1592–1598). Among his twenty-three victories, the Battle of Myeongnyang and the Battle of Hansan Island are the most famous battles.

In 1592, Toyotomi Hideyoshi gave the order to invade Korea and use it as a forward base to conquer Ming China. After the Japanese attacked Busan, Yi began his naval operations from his headquarters at Yeosu. Despite never having commanded a naval battle in his life, he won the Battle of Okpo, Battle of Sacheon, and several others in quick succession. His string of victories made the Japanese generals suddenly wary of the threat at sea.

Hideyoshi was fully aware of the need to control the seas during the invasion. Having failed to hire two Portuguese galleons to help him, he increased the size of his own fleet to 1700 vessels, assuming that he could overwhelm the Joseon navy with numerical superiority.

There were numerous reasons why Yi was so successful against the Japanese fleets. Yi had prepared for the war by checking the status of his soldiers, granaries, and supplies, replacing them when it was necessary. As part of this preparation, Yi resurrected and built the turtle ship, which was a considerable factor in his victories. Yi also had a great deal of information about the southern Korean coast and he planned his battles using the sea tides and narrow straits to his advantage.

Yi was a charismatic leader, and was able to maintain his soldiers' morale despite constantly being low on supplies and food, and continuous news of countless Korean losses in ground battles. In some records, it is stated that he went as far as to personally fulfill some of his soldiers' dying wishes. He demonstrated his loyalty to the people by treating them with respect and fighting amongst them even when endangered. 

The Joseon panokseon were structurally stronger than Japanese ships at the time. Panokseon had stronger hulls and could carry at least 20 cannons, compared to the Japanese 4. Japanese ship-mounted cannons were inferior to the Koreans' in both range and power.  Admiral Yi was an excellent naval strategist. The Japanese navy's strongest tactic was to board enemy ships and engage in hand-to-hand combat.

Four campaigns of 1592

A Japanese invasion force landed at Busan and Dadaejin, port cities on the southern tip of Joseon. The Japanese, without meeting any naval resistance, quickly captured these ports and began a lightning march north. They reached Seoul in just nineteen days, on May 2, 1592, due to the military inefficiency of the Joseon army, especially at the Battle of Sangju and the failure to defend Joryeong Pass.

After capturing Hanseong and Pyongyang, the Japanese planned to cross the Yalu River into Chinese territory, and use the waters west of the Korean peninsula to supply the invasion. However, Yi Sun-sin was able to stay informed on all his enemy's activities.

First campaign

Yi had never officially studied naval warfare in his limited time in the military academy, and neither he, nor his subordinates had experienced naval combat before the Japanese invasion.

On the June 13, 1592, Admiral Yi and Admiral Yi Eok-gi (이억기; 李億祺; 1561–1597), the commander of the Right Jeolla navy, set sail with 24 Panokseons, 15 small warships, and 46 boats (i.e. fishing boats), and arrived at the waters of the Gyeongsang Province by sunset. Next day, the Jeolla fleet sailed to the arranged location where Admiral Won Gyun (원균; 元均; 1540–1597) was supposed to meet them, and met the admiral on June 15. The augmented flotilla of 91 ships then began circumnavigating the Geoje Island, bound for the Gadeok Island, but scouting vessels detected 50 Japanese vessels at the Okpo harbor. Upon sighting the approaching Korean fleet, some of the Japanese who had been busying themselves with plundering got back to their ships, and began to flee. At this, the Korean fleet encircled the Japanese ships and finished them with artillery bombardments. The Koreans spotted five more Japanese vessels that night, and managed to destroy four. The next day, the Koreans approached 13 Japanese ships at Jeokjinpo as reported by the intelligence. In the same manner as the previous success at Okpo, the Korean fleet destroyed 11 Japanese ships – completing the Battle of Okpo without a loss of a single ship.

Second campaign

About three weeks after the Battle of Okpo, Admirals Yi and Won sailed with a total of 26 ships (23 under Admiral Yi) toward the Bay of Sacheon upon receiving an intelligence report of a Japanese presence. Admiral Yi had left behind his fishing vessels that used to make up most of his fleet in favor of his newly completed turtle ship. Admiral Yi ordered the fleet to feign withdrawal, which caused the Japanese to eagerly pursue the Korean fleet with their 12 vessels. With the Japanese ships drawn out of the safety of the harbor, the Korean navy countered, and with the turtle ship leading the charge, they successfully destroyed all 12 ships. Admiral Yi was shot by a bullet in his left shoulder, but survived.

On July 10, 1592, the Korean fleet destroyed 21 Japanese ships at the Battle of Dangpo. On July 13, they destroyed 26 Japanese warship at the Battle of Danghangpo.

Third campaign

In response to the Korean navy's success, Toyotomi Hideyoshi recalled three admirals from land-based activities: Wakizaka Yasuharu, Kato Yoshiaki, and Kuki Yoshitaka. They were the only ones with naval responsibilities in the entirety of the Japanese invasion forces. However, the admirals arrived in Busan nine days before Hideyoshi's order was actually issued, and assembled a squadron to counter the Korean navy. Eventually Admiral Wakizaka completed his preparations, and his eagerness to win military honor pushed him to launch an attack against the Koreans without waiting for the other admirals to finish.

The combined Korean navy of 70 ships under the commands of Admirals Yi Sun-sin and Yi Eok-gi was carrying out a search-and-destroy operation because the Japanese troops on land were advancing into the Jeolla Province. The Jeolla Province was the only Korean territory to be untouched by a major military action, and served as home for the three admirals and the only active Korean naval force. The admirals considered it best to destroy naval support for the Japanese to reduce the effectiveness of the enemy ground troops.

On August 13, 1592, the Korean fleet sailing from the Miruk Island at Dangpo received local intelligence that a large Japanese fleet was nearby. The following morning, the Korean fleet spotted the Japanese fleet of 82 vessels anchored in the straits of Gyeonnaeryang. Because of the narrowness of the strait and the hazard posed by the underwater rocks, Admiral Yi sent six ships to lure out 63 Japanese vessels into the wider sea, and the Japanese fleet followed. There the Japanese fleet was surrounded by the Korean fleet in a semicircular formation called "crane wing" (학익진) by Admiral Yi. With at least three turtle ships (two of which were newly completed) spearheading the clash against the Japanese fleet, the Korean vessels fired volleys of cannonballs into the Japanese formation. Then the Korean ships engaged in a free-for-all battle with the Japanese ships, maintaining enough distance to prevent the Japanese from boarding; Admiral Yi permitted melee combats only against severely damaged Japanese ships.

The battle ended in a Korean victory, with Japanese losses of 59 ships – 47 destroyed and 12 captured in the Battle of Hansan Island. Several Korean prisoners of war were rescued by the Korean soldiers throughout the fight. Admiral Wakisaka escaped due to the speed of his flagship. When the news of the defeat at the Battle of Hansando reached Toyotomi Hideyoshi, he ordered that the Japanese invasion forces cease all naval operations.

On August 16, 1592, Yi Sun-sin led their fleet to the harbor of Angolpo where 42 Japanese vessels were docked.

Fourth campaign

In September 1592, Yi left his base at Hansan Island and attacked the Japanese in Busan harbor. Yi withdrew his forces from Busan harbor after the battle due to the absence of a landing force.

Aftermath of four campaigns of 1592
Yi was victorious in every single operation (at least 15 battles) of the four campaigns of 1592. His campaigns resulted in hundreds of sunken Japanese warships, transports, supply ships and thousands of Japanese naval casualties.

In 1593, Admiral Yi was appointed to command the combined navies of the three southern provinces with the title Naval Commander of the Three Provinces (삼도수군통제사; 三道水軍統制使) which gave him command over the Right and Left Navies of Jeolla province, the Right and Left Navies of Gyeongsang province, and the Navy of Chungcheong province.

Turtle Ships

One of Yi's greatest accomplishments was resurrecting and improving the turtle ship. With his creative mind and the support of his subordinates, Yi was able to devise the geobukseon, or Turtle Ship. Contrary to popular belief, the turtle ship was not actually invented by Admiral Yi; rather, he improved upon an older design that had been suggested during the reign of King Taejong.

The turtle ships designed by Yi held eleven cannons on each side of the ship, with two each at the stern and the bow. The ship's figurehead was in the shape of a dragon. The figurehead itself held up to four cannons, and emitted a smokescreen that, in combination with its fierce appearance, was meant to be used as psychological warfare. The sides of the turtle ship were dotted with smaller holes from which arrows, guns, and mortars could be fired. The roof was covered with planks and spikes. The purpose of the spikes was to prevent the ship from being boarded by the enemy. The larger Japanese ships' sides were higher than the turtle ships' and thus, the spikes prevented boarders from jumping down onto the roof without risking impalement. There were two masts that held two large sails. The turtle ship was also steered and powered by twenty oars, each of which were pulled by two men during fair conditions and five in foul seas or combat.

There is a continuing debate as to whether the turtle ship had two decks or three; historians still have no definitive answer. Whichever is the case, it is clear that the turtle ship employed multiple decks to separate the rowers from the combat compartment. This enabled the turtle ship to be very mobile since wind and manpower could be used simultaneously. Most support the argument of two decks since that was what was drawn out in the first and second designs of the turtle ships. Some historians maintain that, since Yi was a unique individual and often pursued innovative ideas (contrary to the established wisdom of his peers), it is possible that he had the turtle ship built with three decks. It is known that his flagship, a panokseon, had three decks during his campaigns, so there is support for the belief that the turtle ship had three decks.

Turtle ships were the most famous part of Admiral Yi's fleet; however, he never deployed more than five in any one battle. The Joseon Dynasty used cannons as its primary offensive naval weapon. Historically, they had often used guns and cannons against Japanese pirates as early as the 1390s. The Joseon navy did not implement the ship-boarding strategy that the Japanese navy did, so it was imperative that their warships "stand off" from Japanese vessels. Admiral Yi made it a strategic priority to avoid hand-to-hand combat, in which the Japanese navy specialized. The turtle ship was developed to support his tactic against Japanese fleets.

Turtle ships were first used in the Battle of Sacheon (1592) and were used in nearly every battle until the devastating Battle of Chilchonryang, when a Japanese double-agent plot nearly succeeded, resulting in every turtle ship and all but 13 panokseon being sunk. The turtle ships did not re-appear in battle until the Battle of Noryang.

Turtle ships were mostly used to spearhead attacks. They were best used in tight areas and around islands rather than the open sea.

Japanese double-agent plot
As Yi won battle after battle, Hideyoshi and his commanders became anxious as they neared Busan. Yi constantly attacked and delayed supply ships bringing food, weapons, and reinforcements to the Japanese. At one point, the entire invasion was halted just before attacking Pyongyang when supplies and troops failed to reach the First and Second Divisions.

Hideyoshi soon adjusted. At Busan, the Japanese warships were reinforced and some cannons added to larger ships. The fleet clustered beneath the harbor's defenses of heavy shore-mounted cannons that were acquired from the armory. But, above all, the Japanese knew that, for a successful invasion of Joseon, Yi had to be eliminated. Not a single Japanese ship would be safe for as long as he was commanding the sea.

Taking advantage of the many internal court rivalries of the Joseon Dynasty, the Japanese devised a plan. A Japanese double agent named Yoshira (要時羅) was sent to the Joseon general Kim Gyeong-seo (김경서; 金景瑞; 1564–1624), and convinced the general that he would spy on the Japanese. Yoshira played this role until Kim began believing anything he would say.

One day, he told General Kim Gyeong-seo that the Japanese general Katō Kiyomasa would be coming on a certain date with a great fleet for another attack on the south shores and insisted that Admiral Yi be sent to lay an ambush. General Kim agreed and sent the message to Field Marshal Gwon Yul (권율; 權慄; 1537–1599), Commander-in-Chief (도원수; 導元帥) of the Joseon military, who, in turn, sent the message to King Seonjo. King Seonjo, who was desperate for victories to loosen the Japanese grip on his kingdom, gave permission for the attack. When General Kim gave Admiral Yi his orders, the admiral refused to carry them out, for he knew that the location given by the spy was studded with sunken rocks and was thus extremely dangerous. Admiral Yi also refused because he did not trust the words of spies.

When General Kim informed the king of Admiral Yi's refusal, the admiral's enemies at court quickly insisted on his replacement by General Won Gyun, former commander of the Gyeongsang Province Western Fleet & Commander of the Jeolla Province Ground Forces. They advised that Admiral Yi be arrested.

As a result, in 1597, Yi was relieved of command, placed under arrest, and taken to Seoul in chains to be imprisoned and tortured. Yi was tortured almost to the point of death by using simple torture tactics such as whipping, flogging, burning, the cudgel, or even the classic technique of leg breaking torture. King Seonjo wanted to have Yi killed, but the admiral's supporters at court, chiefly the minister Jeong Tak (정탁; 鄭琢; 1526–1605), convinced the king to spare him due to his past service record. The prime minister, Yu Seong-ryong, who was Yi's childhood friend and his main supporter, remained silent during this deadly hour. Spared the death penalty, Admiral Yi was again demoted to the rank of a common infantry soldier under General Gwon Yul. This penalty was worse than death for Joseon generals at that time, since they lived by honor. However, Yi responded to this humiliation as a most obedient subject, quietly going about his work as if his rank and orders were appropriate. Despite his low rank, many officers treated him with respect, since they knew that the admiral did nothing wrong. Yi would stay under General Gwon Yul's command for a short while until Won Gyun's death at the Battle of Chilchonryang, which would lead to his reinstatement.

Joseon defeat at Chilchonryang and reinstatement of Admiral Yi
With Yi stripped of influence and negotiations breaking down in 1596, Hideyoshi again ordered an attack on Joseon. The second Japanese invasion landed in the first month of 1597 with a force of 140,000 men transported on 1000 ships. In response, Ming China sent thousands of reinforcements to aid Joseon. With the help of the Ming, the Joseon army was able to halt the Japanese offensive and push it back during the winter of 1597, before the Japanese were able to reach the Joseon capitol of Hanseong.

On the high seas, Yi's successor Won Gyun failed to respond to reports from his scouts and allowed the Japanese to land critical reinforcements at Sosang Harbor for their land offensive unopposed. Without adequate reconnaissance or planning, Won Gyun decided to attack with the entire naval force of Joseon at his disposal; a fleet consisting of 150 warships operated by 30,000 men that had been carefully assembled and trained by Admiral Yi. Won Gyun left anchor at Yeosu with the fleet and sailed into waters marked by treacherous rocks where the Japanese ambushed the Joseon fleet in the Battle of Chilchonryang on August 28, 1597. Ignorant of the strength and disposition of the enemy, Won was stunned to find a Japanese fleet of 500 to 1000 ships which immediately closed for melee combat, denying the Joseon ships the advantages of superior seamanship and cannon fire. The exhausted Joseon sailors were reduced to fighting boarding actions while heavily outnumbered and slaughtered en masse.

The Joseon fleet was decimated with only 13 warships surviving under Admiral Bae Seol, who fled before battle was fully engaged to save the warships under his command. After the destruction of the Joseon fleet, Won Gyun and Yi Eok-gi, another Joseon commander, fled to an island with a band of survivors but were killed by waiting Japanese soldiers from the nearby fort. The Battle of Chilchonryang was the only naval victory for the Japanese during the war against Joseon. When King Seonjo and the royal court learned of the catastrophic defeat, they hurriedly pardoned and reinstated Admiral Yi as commander of the greatly reduced Joseon fleet.

Battle of Myeongnyang

Admiral Yi located the 13 warships and rallied the 200 surviving sailors. Together with his flagship, Admiral Yi's entire fleet totaled 13 ships, none of which were turtle ships. In the belief that the Joseon fleet would never be restorable, King Seonjo, sent an edict to Admiral Yi to abandon the warships and take his men to join the ground forces under General Gwon Yul. Admiral Yi responded with a letter written "...your servant still doth have twelve warships under his command and he is still alive, that the enemy shall never be safe in the West Sea (the Yellow Sea being the closest body of water to Hanseong)."

Emboldened after their victory at Chilchonryang, Japanese admirals Kurushima Michifusa, Todo Takatora, Kato Yoshiaki, and Wakisaka Yasuharu sailed out of Busan Harbor with a fleet of over 300 ships, confident in being able to defeat Admiral Yi. Elimination of the Joseon fleet would mean unrestricted movement of supplies and reinforcements from Japan for the offensive drive on land towards Hanseong and beyond.

After careful study of potential battlefields, in October 1597 Admiral Yi lured the Japanese fleet into the Myeongnyang Strait, by sending a fast warship near the Japanese naval base and luring the Japanese fleet out of anchorage. The Japanese assumed that this was a Joseon scouting ship and that pursuing it would lead to the location of Admiral Yi, giving them an opportunity to destroy the remnants of the Joseon fleet. What they did not know was that they were being lured into a masterfully devised trap.

There were several reasons why Admiral Yi decided on this location for battle. Myeongnyang Strait had currents, eddies, and whirlpools so powerful that ships could only enter safely a few at a time. The north–south tidal flow reversed every three hours, limiting the time that the Japanese could mount an offensive. The strait was sufficiently narrow that it would prove impossible for the Japanese to flank or envelop the numerically inferior Joseon fleet. The deep shadows of the surrounding hillsides provided the Joseon ships with concealment. On that particular day there was also a heavy mist, dramatically reducing visibility in favor of the Joseon fleet. Therefore, despite being vastly outnumbered, Admiral Yi used the terrain restrictions to neutralize the Japanese navy's staggering numerical advantage.

The Japanese fleet of approximately 333 ships (133 warships, at least 200 logistical support ships) entered Myeongnyang Strait in groups. The Japanese ships that made it through were met by 13 Joseon warships obscured by the shadows of the surrounding hills, ready with archers and cannons, and the melee-based Japanese found themselves unable to fight effectively and break through the superior Joseon ranged fire. The unpredictable current eventually wreaked havoc on the Japanese; their ships found themselves unable to maneuver and collided with each other when the tide reversed, while also presenting a perfect target for the Joseon naval artillery. Admiral Yi was astonishingly able to rout a force that outnumbered him more than 25 to 1 in ships alone. About 31 of the 333 Japanese ships that entered the Myeongnyang Strait were destroyed or damaged. Joseon losses on the other hand were around ten casualties and no ships lost. Kurushima Michifusa was killed on his flagship by Joseon archers; his body in its ornate armor was fished out of the water, his severed head was put on display to further demoralize the Japanese fleet.

Admiral Yi's miraculous victory at the Battle of Myeongnyang turned the tide of the entire war against the Japanese; their ground forces on the verge of invading Hanseong were cut off from steady flow of supplies and reinforcements, and forced to pull back. Today, the battle is celebrated in Korea as one of Admiral Yi's greatest victories. No other engagement involving such an outnumbered fleet has resulted in such a disproportionate victory, making it one of the greatest achievements in naval warfare.

Final battle and Admiral Yi's death

On December 15, 1598, a huge Japanese fleet under the command of Shimazu Yoshihiro, was amassed in Sachon Bay, on the east end of Noryang Strait. Shimazu's goal was to break the allied forces' blockade on Konishi Yukinaga, join the two fleets, and sail home to Japan. Admiral Yi, meanwhile, knew exactly where Shimazu was, after receiving reports from scouts and local fishermen.

At this time, the Joseon fleet consisted of 82 panokseon and three turtle ships, with 8,000 soldiers under Admiral Yi. The Ming fleet consisted of six large war junks, 57 lighter war galleys  and two panokseon given to Chen Lin by Admiral Yi, with 5,000 Ming soldiers of the Guangdong squadron and 2,600 Ming marines who fought aboard Joseon ships.

The battle began at two o'clock in the early morning of December 16, 1598. Like Admiral Yi's previous battles, the Japanese were unable to respond effectively to the Korean's tactics. The tightness of Noryang Strait hindered lateral movement, and Yi's maneuvers prevented the Japanese fleet from boarding their enemies' vessels, their primary naval tactic.

As the Japanese retreated, Admiral Yi ordered a vigorous pursuit. During this time, a stray arquebus bullet from an enemy ship struck Admiral Yi, near his left armpit. Sensing that the wound was fatal, and fearing a repeat of the Battle of Chilchonryang, the admiral uttered, "The war is at its height – wear my armor and beat my war drums. Do not announce my death." He died moments later.

Only two people witnessed his death: Yi Hoe, Yi's eldest son, and Yi Wan, his nephew. Admiral Yi's son and nephew struggled to regain their composure and carried the admiral's body into his cabin before others could notice. For the remainder of the battle, Yi Wan wore his uncle's armor and continued to beat the war drum to encourage the pursuit.

Comrade Chen Lin 
During the battle, Chen Lin and Yi were friends and allies who helped and rescued each other several times. When Chen Lin called for Admiral Yi to thank him for coming to his aid, he was met by Yi Wan, who announced that his uncle was dead. It is said that Chen himself was so shocked that he fell to the ground three times, beating his chest and crying. News of Admiral Yi's death spread quickly throughout the allied fleet and both Joseon and Ming sailors and fighting men wailed in grief. Chen Lin later reported the news of Yi's death to Wanli Emperor, where he bestowed gifts and eulogies on Chen and Yi. Since then, Yi and Chen were memorialized as national heroes in Korea. Chen's descendants were later welcomed back to Korea to start the Gwangdong Jin clan, because of Chen Lin's contributions in defeating the Japanese and his camaraderie with Yi Sunsin.

Admiral Yi's body was brought back to his hometown in Asan to be buried next to his father, Yi Jeong (in accordance to Korean tradition). Shrines, both official and unofficial, were constructed in his honor all throughout the land."

Legacy

Military evaluation 
Some say Yi is an exemplar of conduct for both Koreans and even Japanese.

Some military historians like Joseph Cummins and George Alexander Ballard place Yi on par with Admiral Horatio Nelson as one of the greatest naval commanders in history. 
 Admiral George Alexander Ballard of the Royal Navy compared Yi to Lord Nelson of England:

It is always difficult for Englishmen to admit that Nelson ever had an equal in his profession, but if any man is entitled to be so regarded, it should be this great naval commander of Asiatic race who never knew defeat and died in the presence of the enemy; of whose movements a track-chart might be compiled from the wrecks of hundreds of Japanese ships lying with their valiant crews at the bottom of the sea, off the coasts of the Korean peninsula... and it seems, in truth, no exaggeration to assert that from first to last he never made a mistake, for his work was so complete under each variety of circumstances as to defy criticism... His whole career might be summarized by saying that, although he had no lessons from history to serve as a guide, he waged war on the sea as it should be waged if it is to produce definite results, and ended by making the supreme sacrifice of a defender of his country. (The Influence of the Sea on The Political History of Japan, pp. 66–67.)

Admiral Togo regarded Admiral Yi as his superior. At a party held in his honor, Togo took exception to a speech comparing him to Lord Nelson and Yi Sun-sin.

It may be proper to compare me with Nelson, but not with Korea's Yi Sun-sin, for he has no equal. (The Imjin War, by Samuel Hawley, pg. 490)

Prior to the 1905 Battle of Tsushima, Lieutenant Commander Kawada Isao recalled in his memoirs that:

...naturally we could not help but remind ourselves of Korea's Yi Sun-sin, the world's first sea commander, whose superlative personality, strategy, invention, commanding ability, intelligence, and courage were all worthy of our admiration. (The Imjin War, by Samuel Hawley, pg. 490)

Admiral Tetsutaro Sato of the Imperial Japanese Navy mentioned the Korean admiral in his book published in 1908:
Throughout history there have been few generals accomplished at the tactics of frontal attack, sudden attack, concentration and dilation. Napoleon, who mastered the art of conquering the part with the whole, can be held to have been such a general, and among admirals, two further tactical geniuses may be named: in the East, Yi Sun-sin of Korea, and in the West, Horatio Nelson of England. Undoubtedly, Yi is a supreme naval commander even on the basis of the limited literature of the Seven-Year War, and despite the fact that his bravery and brilliance are not known to the West, since he had the misfortune to be born in Joseon Dynasty. Anyone who can be compared to Yi should be better than Michiel de Ruyter from Netherlands. Nelson is far behind Yi in terms of personal character and integrity. Yi was the inventor of the covered warship known as the turtle ship. He was a truly great commander and a master of the naval tactics of three hundred years ago. --A Military History of the Empire (Japanese: 帝國國防史論), p. 399

Reactions by Joseon government
Admiral Yi repeatedly defeated the Japanese invasion force in battle, while preserving the lives of his soldiers and respecting their families. Yi was supported by the people of Joseon not only for his victories, but his kindness and gratitude towards those affected by the hardships of war. They had great faith in Admiral Yi and he was regarded as more than just an admiral.

By contrast, King Seonjo accomplished nothing. The Joseon Dynasty's king had failed to defend the kingdom and his cowardly flight to Uiju left his reputation in ruins. The Joseon government was plagued by factionalism driven by jealousy; the ministers despised the successful and virtuous admiral, and manipulated King Seonjo to view Admiral Yi as a potential traitor. It is plausible to believe that King Seonjo and his court truly feared Admiral Yi's victories and reputation amongst the people as the foundations for a revolt leading King Seonjo to have him arrested and tortured. Defended by his loyal friend, Prime Minister Yu Seong-ryong, Admiral Yi was spared execution twice. The conspiracies worked against Admiral Yi from gaining the men, materiel, and operational freedom to decisively destroy the Japanese invasion force.

It should also be noted that according to a recent Choson Ilbo article, historians have discovered written government records of the Joseon government's reaction to Admiral Yi's death. The records show that King Seonjo expressed a "blank expression", offering no signs of sadness or shock. Nearly all awards to Admiral Yi and his deeds were awarded posthumously.

Cultural depictions

Film and television
Yi's life has been depicted in two motion pictures, both entitled Seong-ung Yi Sun-sin ("The Saintly Hero Yi Sun-sin"). The first is a 1962 black-and-white movie, and the second, based upon his war diaries, was made in color in 1971.

A 2005 Korean film, Heaven's Soldiers directed by Min Joon-ki, portrayed a young Yi Sun-sin fighting the Jurchen tribes, along with local villagers and North and South Korean soldiers who traveled in time, from 2005 to 1572, with Halley's Comet. Unusually, the film presented Yi as a cunning, slightly eccentric young man, rather than a distinguished austere hero, a couple of decades before Imjin war. Some historical events were also distorted: most notably Yi's campaign against the Jurchens, which did not happen in 1572 but a few years later, after his 1576 military examination. The film, financed with a comfortable budget by Korean standards ($7–8 million), was a relative commercial success in 2005. The film's theme clearly uses the figure of Yi, venerated as a hero in both parts of present-day Korea, to plead for Korean reunification.

From September 4, 2004, to August 28, 2005, a 104-episode drama series was aired on KBS. The show, titled Immortal Admiral Yi Sun-sin, dealt mostly with the events related to the Japanese invasions of Korea, as well as the life of the admiral. It became a popular drama in China and was re-aired in certain ethnic channels in the United States as well. The drama was criticized for the many artistic licenses taken, such as depicting Yi as weak and lonely in his early life and taking liberties with the events surrounding his death. On the other hand, many people complimented the way the drama portrayed the whole drama with a more human touch. It described the admiral as a true man who had to overcome many dangers and difficulties quite frequently alone, not just a hero among the clouds. This drama was a heated topic at the time since it overlapped with rising tensions in the ongoing Liancourt Rocks dispute; the series further strained relations between South Korea and Japan in the issue's most recent outbreak.

Film director Kim Han-min created a film trilogy about battles led by Yi Sun-sin. The first film, The Admiral: Roaring Currents (2014) revolves around the events of the Battle of Myeongnyang and it became the most-watched film in South Korean history, attracting 17 million movie-goers. The second film Hansan: Rising Dragon (2022), is based on the Battle of Hansan Island. The upcoming third film Noryang depicts the Battle of Noryang.

Actors who have played Yi Sun-sin
 Park Joong-hoon in the 2005 film Heaven's Soldiers.
 Kim Myung-min in the 2004–2005 KBS1 TV series Immortal Admiral Yi Sun-sin.
 Yoo Dong-geun in the 2013 MBC TV series Gu Family Book.
 Choi Min-sik in the 2014 film The Admiral: Roaring Currents.
 Park Hae-il in the 2022 film Hansan: Rising Dragon.

Literature
Yi also inspired literary works. In 2001, Kim Hoon's first novel, Song of the Sword, was a commercial and critical success in South Korea. In his book, the journalist-turned-novelist describes that Yi deliberately stood at the front of his ship in his final battle making himself a target for Japanese gunmen, thinking that ending his life in this honorable fashion could be better than facing another political ploys which was likely to wait him in the Joseon royal court after the war. For this poetic first-person narrative written from Yi's perspective, he received the Dongin Literature Award, the most prestigious literary prize in the nation.

Comics
Yi appears as the titular protagonist of a history fiction graphic novel series, produced by Onrie Kompan Productions since 2009.

Video games
Yi Sun-Sin is a playable character in the video game Mobile Legends: Bang Bang.
A game scenario in which the player can assume Yi's role is featured in the Age of Empires II extension pack The Conquerors.
Yi Sun-Sin is a playable character in the Mobile/PC Game Rise of Kingdoms.
A game campaign in which the player can assume Yi's role is featured in the Empires: Dawn of the Modern World.

Awards named after Yi
Although his successes were often ignored by the Korean royal court during his life, after his death various honors were bestowed upon him, including the title of Chungmugong (충무공; 忠武公; Duke of Loyalty and Warfare), an enrollment as a Seonmu Ildeung Gongsin (선무일등공신; 宣武一等功臣; First-class military order of merit during the reign of Seonjo), and two posthumous offices, Yeonguijeong (영의정; 領議政; Prime Minister), and the Deokpung Buwongun (덕풍부원군; 德豊府院君; The Prince of the Court from Deokpung). His title of Samdo Sugun Tongjesa (삼도 수군 통제사 ; 三道水軍統制使), literally meaning "Naval Commander of the Three Provinces", was the title used for the commander of the Korean navy until 1896.
Admiral Yi's posthumous title, Chungmugong, is used as South Korea's third highest military honor, known as The Cordon of Chungmu of the Order of Military Merit and Valor. He was posthumously granted the title of Prince of Deokpung Chungmuro (충무로; 忠武路). In North Korea, the military awards the Order of Admiral Yi Sun-Sin (이순신장군훈장) to flag officers and naval commanders for outstanding leadership.

Prominent statues of Admiral Yi have been erected in the middle of Sejongno in central Seoul (the Statue of Admiral Yi Sun-sin) and at Busan Tower in Busan.
The city of Chungmu on the southern coast of Korea, now renamed Tongyeong, is named in honor of his posthumous title and the site of his headquarters. Additionally, a street in downtown Seoul is named after him, and the Yi Sun-sin Bridge was built near Yeosu and opened to traffic on May 10, 2012, becoming the longest suspension bridge in Korea.

South Korea's KDX-II naval destroyer class, and the first commissioned ship of the class, are named Chungmugong Yi Sun-sin.

An ITF-style Taekwondo pattern is named after Yi's posthumous name of Chungmu.

A depiction of Admiral Yi is featured on the front of the 100 South Korean won coin.

Family 
Father: Yi Jeong (이정; July 1511 - 15 November 1583), Internal Prince Deokyeon (덕연부원군, 德淵府院君)
Grandfather: Yi Baek-rok (이백록) (? - 1546); Yi Geo (이거)'s son
Grandmother: Lady Byeon of Chogye Byeon clan (초계 변씨); daughter of Byeon Ham (변함)
Mother: Lady Byeon of the Chogye Byeon clan (정경부인 초계 변씨; 1515–1597)
Grandfather: Byeon Su-rim (변수림)
Sibling(s):
Older brother: Yi Hui-sin (이희신)
Older brother: Yi Yo-sin (이요신)
Younger brother: Yi Woo-sin (이우신)
Wives and issue(s):
Wife: Lady Bang of the Onyang Bang clan (정경부인 온양 방씨); Bang Jin (방진)'s daughter
Son: Yi Hoe (이회) (1567 - 1625)
Son: Yi Yeol (이열)
Son: Yi Myeon (이면) (1577 - 1597)
Daughter: Lady Yi of the Deoksu Yi clan (덕수 이씨); married Hong Bi (홍비), Hong Ga-sin (홍가신)'s son
Concubine: Lady Oh of the Haeju Oh clan (해주 오씨)
Son: Yi Hun (이훈; b. 1569)
Son: Yi Sin (이신; b. 1574)
Daughter: Lady Yi of the Deoksu Yi clan (덕수 이씨); married Im Jin (임진)
Daughter: Lady Yi of the Deoksu Yi clan (덕수 이씨); married Yun Hyo-jeon (윤효전)
Concubine: Lady Buandaek (부안댁) – No issue.

See also

 History of Korea
 Naval history of Korea
Joseon Navy
 Joseon Army
 Turtle ship
 Immortal Admiral Yi Sun-sin
 Nanjung ilgi, War Diary of Admiral Yi Sun-sin
Joseon dynasty
Chen Lin (Yi's fellow ally and comrade who fought alongside and brought news of his battles and death to China)

Footnotes

References

Further reading 
 The Influence of the Sea on The Political History of Japan (1921) 
 War Diary (Nan Jung Il Gi), the autobiographical diary of Admiral Yi Sun-Sin
 Choson Joong-Gi, Noon-Eu-Ro Bo-Nen Han-Gook-Yuk-Sa #7. Joong-Ang-Gyo-Yook-Yun-Goo-Won, Ltd. Copyright 1998.
 Katano, Tsugio yi Sun-Sin and Hideyoshi (1996)
 Hawley, Samuel 2005 The Imjin War: Japan's Sixteenth-Century Invasion of Korea and Attempt to Conquer China. Republic of Korea and U.S.A.: Co-Published by The Royal Asiatic Society and The Institute of East Asian Studies, University of California, Berkeley.
 Turnbull, Stephen. "Samurai Invasion: Japan's Korean War 1592–1598"  (2002) Cassell & Co., London.

External links

  Research Institute of Yi Sun-sin – Institute of Soon Chun Hyang University
 Chungmugong Yi Sun-Sin – Gyeongsangnam-do Tourism Office's official Yi Sun-sin site
 The Great Admiral Yi Sun-Sin  – Asan city's official Yi Sun-sin site
 Hyeonchungsa Shrine Management Office
 Yi Sun-sin: the man who transforms Korea – VANK's Yi Sun-sin project site
 Admiral Yi Sun-sin – A Korean Hero
 Yi Sun-sin

 
1545 births
1598 deaths
16th-century Korean people
Korean admirals
Korean generals
Korean military personnel killed in action
Military history of Korea
People of the Japanese invasions of Korea (1592–1598)